Heavy Horses is the eleventh studio album by British progressive rock band Jethro Tull, released on 10 April 1978.

The album is often considered the second in a trio of folk rock albums released by the band at the end of the 1970s, alongside Songs from the Wood (1977) and Stormwatch (1979). In contrast to the British folklore-inspired lyrical content found on Songs From the Wood, Heavy Horses adopts a more realist and earthly perspective of country living — the album and its title track are dedicated to the "indigenous working ponies and horses of Great Britain". Musically, the album sees the band continuing the combination of folk and progressive rock found on Songs From the Wood, although with an overall darker and more sober sound fitting the changed lyrical content.

Recording
Heavy Horses was the first album recorded by Jethro Tull at the newly constructed Maison Rouge studio in Fulham, London, a custom built recording studio which was funded and owned by Ian Anderson. Much of the album was recorded at night, as Anderson felt that daytime hours at the studio needed to be left open for potential business clients. Keyboardist Dee Palmer recalled her diary entries at the time of recording as saying that "I'd start at 7pm and go home at 7am!" Heavy Horses was the first album on which Anderson began to experience vocal issues, the beginning of an affliction which would become more serious in the 1980s and later develop into chronic obstructive pulmonary disease. Anderson's vocals sound more nasal and gruff on some of the album's tracks as a result, particularly on the title track.

As with the band's previous album Songs From the Wood, other members of the band beyond just Anderson were involved in writing music for the album, with guitarist Martin Barre writing portions of the title track and "No Lullaby" and Palmer writing string arrangements for most of the album as well as the instrumental bridge of "...And the Mouse Police Never Sleeps". Darryl Way of Curved Air guests on the album, playing violin on the title track and "Acres Wild".

Several songs were recorded but then abandoned or otherwise cut from the album during the recording sessions, including the B-side "Beltane", a completely finished song titled "Everything in Our Lives" and an early acoustic version of "Jack-a-Lynn", a song which would later be re-recorded during sessions for the band's 1982 album The Broadsword and the Beast. Many of the unreleased songs recorded during the album's sessions were later released on the 20 Years of Jethro Tull anniversary compilation in 1988 and the 40th anniversary "New Shoes" edition of the album in 2018. Upon remixing of the album for the 40th anniversary edition, it was discovered that the original masters of "Moths" and "Rover" were slightly sharp, likely as a result of a faulty tape machine. The remixed versions of the tracks included on the re-release of the album were slightly pitched down to correct this.

Musical style and themes
While continuing the folk rock style of Songs From the Wood, Heavy Horses sees a tonal shift into more earthly and realist themes of country living, compared with the fantasy and mythology of the previous album. Anderson was again inspired by daily life at his recently purchased country estate in Buckinghamshire, saying that "I was living in the same house in the same place, and getting a bit more involved in farming and other rural stuff... so the horse-hoeing husbandry of the original Jethro Tull era was in the back of my mind." Several of the album's songs were directly inspired by Anderson's personal life at the estate: "...And the Mouse Police Never Sleeps" was partially inspired by his cat Mistletoe, "No Lullaby" was written as an "anti-lullaby" for his son and "Rover" was partially inspired by his dog Lupus. Other songs on the album such as "Weathercock" and the title track paint a cold and practical picture of country living, with the latter track described by Anderson as "a lament for the passing as working animals of those magnificent beasts, the heavy farm horses." Other track's lyrics were inspired by literature, such as "One Brown Mouse" inspired by the Robert Burns poem "To a Mouse" and "Moths" inspired by the John le Carré novel The Naïve and Sentimental Lover. 

Anderson stated that the recording of the album came at a time when other artists were moving towards the new trends in music, and the band decided they did not want "to appear as if we were trying to slip into the post-punk coattails that were worn by The Stranglers or The Police."

Reception

Rolling Stones contemporary review was positive, calling the instrumental arrangements lavish and stating that Heavy Horses and the folk genre, as a follow up to Songs From the Wood, suited Jethro Tull perfectly.

AllMusic calls Heavy Horses one of the prettiest records of the band, praising both Martin Barre's and John Glascock's playing as Robin Black engineering and the special participation of Curved Air violinist Darryl Way.

Track listing1978 original release2003 bonus tracks2018 40th Anniversary New Shoes Deluxe Edition

On 2 March 2018 Jethro Tull released a five-disc ‘bookset’ version of Heavy Horses''' with a 96-page booklet that includes a track-by-track annotation of the album and its associated recordings by Ian Anderson.  It is similar to the band's other 40th Anniversary reissues, with the first disc containing another Steven Wilson stereo remix followed by ‘associated recordings’ including seven previously unreleased tracks. The second and third discs contain 22 previously unreleased live tracks, recorded at the Festhalle in Berne Switzerland during the European leg of their 1978 Heavy Horses'' Tour, from 28 May 1978, remixed to stereo by Jakko Jakszyk.  The set also includes DVDs.

Personnel
Jethro Tull
 Ian Anderson – lead vocals, flute, acoustic guitar, additional electric guitar, mandolin
 Martin Barre – electric guitar
 John Glascock – backing vocals, bass guitar
 John Evan – piano, organ
 Dee Palmer – keyboards, portative pipe organ, orchestral arrangements
 Barriemore Barlow – drums, percussion

Additional personnel
 Darryl Way – violin (on "Acres Wild" and "Heavy Horses")
 Shona Anderson – photography 
 Robin Black – sound engineer 
 James Cotier – photography

Charts

Certifications

References

External links 
 Jethro Tull - Heavy Horses (1978) album review by Bruce Eder, credits & releases at AllMusic.com
 Jethro Tull - Heavy Horses (1978) album releases & credits at Discogs.com
 Jethro Tull - Heavy Horses (1978) album review by vanderb0b at SputnikMusic.com
 Jethro Tull - Heavy Horses (1978/2003 Remaster) album to be listened as stream at Play.Spotify.com

Jethro Tull (band) albums
1978 albums
Chrysalis Records albums
Island Records albums
Albums produced by Ian Anderson